Sapling Pictures is an American television and digital media production company led by Keith Jodoin. In its 20-year history, the company has produced hundreds of hours of content for television, Hollywood film studios and top international brands including Discovery Channel, National Geographic Channel, Warner Brothers, 20th Century Fox, truTV, Animal Planet, TLC, Walt Disney Pictures and Science Channel.

History
In 1998, Jodoin founded Sapling Pictures and began working exclusively with Discovery Channel and its sister companies. The company produced both weekly show promotions and behind-the-scenes content for DVD and Blu-ray releases of Deadliest Catch, Mythbusters, Dirty Jobs, among others. The company won a Promax Award for its short film, 2nd Deadliest Job, a behind-the-scenes featurette on the crew filming the Deadliest Catch television series.

Sapling Pictures produced its first short film, Evenfall in 2003. Electronica band, Hitchcock Blonde, composed an original song, Compromised, for the film's opening title sequence. The spy film screened at the Sedona Film Festival, Phoenix Film Festival, DC Shorts Film Festival and the HD Showcase in Toronto, Canada. Evenfall won the Audience Award at DC Shorts Film Festival in 2005 and played online at the AOL/moviefone Shorts Festival.

In 2006, Sapling Pictures co-produced Dead or Alive (aka Between Life and Death), a series pilot for Discovery International. The show received accolades for writing and cinematography and was awarded top honors from ITVA-DC.

The company received an Emmy Award for Discovery Channel's Gold Rush Alaska in 2013.

Beginning in 2015, Sapling Pictures produced a branded web series for the National Education Association, Fashion Makeover. Two seasons of the "What Not To Wear" styled series was produced for the 3MM members within the NEA membership. The series featured teachers getting a fashion makeover in appreciation for all they do for their students. The success of the series launched a companion series, Classroom Makeover, an HGTV inspired series coaching teachers on how to better organize their classroom.

Productions

Broadcast and promotion
Walking With Dinosaurs – Discovery Channel
Wild, Wild World – Discovery Channel
Mythbusters – Discovery Channel
Deadliest Catch – Discovery Channel
Dirty Jobs – Discovery Channel
Shark Week – Discovery Channel
American Chopper – TLC
Dead or Alive – Discovery International
Kids Going to College? – Fine Living
Gold Rush: Alaska – Discovery Channel
Finding Bigfoot – Animal Planet
Impractical Jokers – truTV
Doomsday Preppers – National Geographic Channel

Shorts and series
Evenfall
Open Door
Posting
Round 2
Hangover Theory
Fashion Makeover
Putt-Putt Challenge
Classroom Makeover

References

External links
Company website

Digital media organizations
Television production companies of the United States
Companies based in Fairfax, Virginia
Mass media companies established in 1998